A Flickering Truth  is a 2015  New Zealand documentary film written and directed by Pietra Brettkelly. It follows the attempts by Ibrahim Arify to restore the Afghan Film archives in Kabul following the Taliban capture of the city. It world premiered in the Venice Classics section at the 72nd edition of the Venice Film Festival. It was selected as the New Zealand entry for the Best Foreign Language Film at the 89th Academy Awards but it was not nominated.

Cast   
 Ibrehim Arif 		 
 Mahmoud Ghafouri 	 	 
 Isaaq Yousif

Awards and accolades
The movie received the Cercle D'or award for Best Documentary in the International competition at the Festival Cinéma du monde de Sherbrooke.

See also
 List of submissions to the 89th Academy Awards for Best Foreign Language Film
 List of New Zealand submissions for the Academy Award for Best Foreign Language Film

References

External links  

New Zealand Film Commission - A Flickering Truth

2015 documentary films
New Zealand documentary films
Dari-language films
Films directed by Pietra Brettkelly
Documentary films about Afghanistan
Documentary films about cinematography
Films scored by Benjamin Wallfisch